The Czech Land Forces are the land warfare force of the Czech Republic. The Land Forces consisting of various types of arms and services complemented by air and special operations forces constitute the core of the Czech Armed Forces. Land Forces Command is located in Olomouc.

Peacetime structure comprises two mechanized brigades, an airborne regiment and specialized regiments of artillery, logistics, engineers, CBRN defence, reconnaissance and electronic warfare. Mechanized brigades are equipped with various types of combat vehicles to ensure the execution of different combat operations.

Tasks 
The Czech Land Forces are the biggest and decisive part of the Army of the Czech Republic. In coordination with other services they are organized to defend the national territory. Under a crisis situation and in the event of hostilities they form the core of operation task force of the allied joint force and eventually they are complemented by mobilized units. The Land Forces are also designed for fulfilment of commitment in compliance with the Article 5 of the North Atlantic Treaty and tasks on behalf of the state administration authorities.

Equipment 

Small arms of the Czech Land Forces are mainly supplied by CZUB, e.g. CZ 805 BREN and BREN 2 assault rifles, CZ 75 and CZ P-10 pistols and CZ Scorpion Evo 3 submachine guns. The Czech Armed Forces are equipped with over 3,000 T810, T815 and T815-7 vehicles of various modifications produced by Tatra.

Principal weapons systems of the Czech Land Forces include T-72 tanks (T-72M1 produced in Czechoslovakia and T-72M4CZ modernized in Czech Republic), BVP-2 infantry fighting vehicles (Czechoslovak-produced version of BMP-2), Pandur II and Iveco LMV wheeled combat vehicles and 152mm vz. 77 DANA self-propelled howitzers.

Air defence and helicopter units are part of the Czech Air Force.

Major armaments and combat equipment as of 1 January 2023:
 82 main battle tanks
 385 armoured fighting vehicles
 167 IFV- and APC-based special vehicles
 137 light armoured vehicles
 172 artillery systems (152mm howitzers and 120mm mortars)

Structure 
Land Forces Command is located in Olomouc. Prague was the location of Land Forces Command from July 2013 to June 2020. Between 2003 and 2013 Land Forces were an integral part of the Joint Forces Command in Olomouc.

The command structure is hierarchical, with brigades and regiments controlling groups of units. Major units are battalion-sized, and minor units are company or platoon-sized units. Airborne Regiment has a unique structure comprising several commandos and centres.

Czech Land Forces are composed of both Regular (full-time) and Active Reserve (part-time) units. Active Reserve platoons, companies and specialized units are affiliated to respective regular units. Moreover, there are 14 Regional Military Headquarters of the Territorial Command, and each one has an Active Reserve infantry company.

Transformation of the 600-strong 43rd Airborne Battalion to 43rd Airborne Regiment with more than 1,200 soldiers scheduled for October 2020 is based upon the 2014 Wales summit declaration regarding the NATO Response Force and Very High Readiness Joint Task Force (VJTF).

Combat Forces 
  4th Rapid Deployment Brigade, in Žatec
 Headquarters and Staff
 Signal Company
 Support Platoon
 41st Mechanized Battalion, in Žatec (Pandur II)
 42nd Mechanized Battalion, in Tábor (Pandur II)
 44th Light Motorized Battalion, in Jindřichův Hradec (Iveco LMV)
 7th Mechanized Brigade, in Hranice
 Headquarters and Staff
 71st Mechanized Battalion, in Hranice (BVP-2)
 72nd Mechanized Battalion, in Přáslavice (BVP-2)
 73rd Tank Battalion, in Přáslavice (T-72M4CZ, T-72M1, Leopard 2A4)
 74th Mechanized Battalion, in Bučovice – transformed from 74th Light Motorized Battalion in 2020 (BVP-2 - will be the first to receive new infantry fighting vehicles CV-90)
 43rd Airborne Regiment, in Chrudim
 1st, 2nd, 3rd, and 4th commando company
 5th Commando Company (Active Reserve)
 Weapons Center (81 mm mortars, anti-tank guided missiles)
 Combat Support Center (Intelligence, Reconnaissance)
 Command Support Center (Signals)
 Logistics Support Center
 Medical Detachment
 Combat Training Center
 Airborne Training Center

Combat Support Forces 
 13th Artillery Regiment, in Jince
 Headquarters and Staff
 Garrison Support Element
 Regimental Aid Post
 Command Support Battery
 131st Artillery Battalion (152mm SpGH DANA)
 132nd Artillery Battalion (152mm SpGH DANA)
 Active Reserve Battery (152mm SpGH DANA)
 STAR Battery (ARTHUR Artillery Tracking Radar, Sněžka Surveillance and Reconnaissance System)
 Logistic Company
 15th Engineer Regiment, in Bechyně
 Headquarters and Staff
 EOD Technical and Information Support Center
 Support Platoon
 Garrison Support Element
 151st Engineer Battalion, in Bechyně
 152nd Engineer Battalion, in Bechyně
 153rd Engineer Battalion, in Olomouc
 31st Radiological, Chemical and Biological Protection Regiment, in Liberec
 Headquarters and Staff
 Support Platoon
 311th Radiological, Chemical and Biological Protection Battalion, in Liberec
 312th Radiological, Chemical and Biological Protection Battalion, in Liberec
 314th Weapons of Mass Destruction Warning Center, in Hostivice
 53rd Reconnaissance and Electronic Warfare Regiment, in Opava
 Headquarters and Staff
 Signal Company
 Support Platoon
 Garrison Support Element
 Regimental Aid Post
 102nd Reconnaissance Battalion, in Prostějov
 532nd Electronic Warfare Battalion, in Opava
 533rd Unmanned Aircraft Systems Battalion, in Prostějov
 ISR Center, in Opava

Combat Service Support Forces 
 14th Logistic Support Regiment, in Pardubice
 Headquarters and Staff
 Command Support Company
 141st Supply Battalion, in Pardubice
 142nd Maintenance Battalion, in Klatovy
 143rd Supply Battalion, in Lipník nad Bečvou

MOD's Logistics Agency has been building the Host Nation Support (HNS) Battalion in Rakovník since October 2018. HNS Battalion is not part of the Land Forces as it reports directly to the Logistics Agency.

Ranks

Commissioned officer ranks
The rank insignia of commissioned officers.

Other ranks
The rank insignia of non-commissioned officers and enlisted personnel.

Notes

References

Military of the Czech Republic
Armies by country